George Wittet (1878-1926) was a Scottish architect who worked mostly in Mumbai, India.

Biography

George Wittet was born in Blair Atholl, Scotland in 1878. He studied architecture with a Mr. Heiton of Perth, Scotland, and worked in  Edinburgh  and York before moving to India. 

Wittet arrived in India in 1904 and became an assistant to John Begg, then Consulting Architect to Mumbai. The two men were responsible for the evolution and subsequent popularity of the Indo-Saracenic Style of architecture. 

On 12 May 1917, Wittet, by then Consulting Architect to the Government of Mumbai, was unanimously elected as the first President of The Indian Institute of Architects.

Wittet designed some of  Mumbai's  best known landmarks: the Chhatrapati Shivaji Maharaj Vastu Saghralaya, the Gateway of India, the Institute of Science, the Small Causes Court at Dhobitalao, the Wadia Maternity Hospital, Bombay House, the King Edward Memorial Hospital, the Grand Hotel and other buildings at the Ballard Estate, by the Mumbai Docks. 

In Karachi, he designed the Karachi Port Trust (KPT) building.

With John Begg he developed and popularised the Indo-Saracenic style in architecture.

He died of acute dysentery in Mumbai in 1926, and is buried in the Sewri cemetery.

References

Scottish architects
People from Perth and Kinross
1878 births
1926 deaths
Academic staff of Sir J. J. School of Art